It Was On Earth That I Knew Joy is a 35-minute science fiction film directed by Jean-Baptiste de Laubier and produced by French clothing label Sixpack France.

The film was presented on February 20, 2010 at SCION Installation, Los Angeles and released online on March 3, 2010.

References

External links
 It Was On Earth That I Knew Joy on vimeo
 It Was On Earth That I Knew Joy Official Trailer
 Sixpack France Web Site

2010 films
French avant-garde and experimental films
2010s avant-garde and experimental films
2010s French films